Bernadett Horváth (born 10 May 1990 in Kapuvár) is a Hungarian handballer who  plays for Mosonmagyaróvári KC SE as a line player.

She has been capped 27 times for the Hungarian junior national team, in which she has scored 55 goals.

Achievements
Nemzeti Bajnokság I:
Winner: 2008, 2009
Nemzeti Bajnokság I/B:
Winner: 2018
 Magyar Kupa:
Winner: 2008, 2009
Bronze Medallist: 2011
EHF Champions League:
Finalist: 2009
Semifinalist: 2008
Junior European Championship:
Silver Medallist: 2009

References

External links

 Bernadett Horváth career statistics at Worldhandball

1990 births
Living people
People from Kapuvár
Hungarian female handball players
Győri Audi ETO KC players
Fehérvár KC players
Sportspeople from Győr-Moson-Sopron County